Hantu may refer to:
Hantu, an Indonesian genus of spiders
Hantu (supernatural creature), a ghost or spirit in Indonesian and Malay
Hantu Air, a spirit of the water
Hantu Penanggal, a female nocturnal ghost
Hantu Pocong, a spirit of the dead
Hantu Raya, a spirit that confers its owner great powers
Hán tự, the Vietnamese term for Chinese characters